This is a shortened version of the tenth chapter of the ICD-9: Diseases of the Genitourinary System. It covers ICD codes 580 to 629. The full chapter can be found on pages 329 to 353 of Volume 1, which contains all (sub)categories of the ICD-9. Volume 2 is an alphabetical index of Volume 1. Both volumes can be downloaded for free from the website of the World Health Organization.

Nephritis, nephrotic syndrome, and nephrosis (580–589)
  Acute glomerulonephritis
  Glomerulonephritis, acute, unspec.
  Nephrotic syndrome
  Nephrotic syndrome, unspec.
  Chronic glomerulonephritis
  Glomerulonephritis, chronic, unspec.
  Nephritis and nephropathy, not specified as acute or chronic
  Acute renal failure
  Renal failure, acute w/ tubular necrosis
  Renal failure, acute, unspec.
  Chronic renal failure
  Renal failure, unspecified
  Renal sclerosis, unspecified
  Disorders resulting from impaired renal function
  Other specified disorders resulting from impaired renal function
  Hyperparathyroidism, secondary, renal
  Renal tubular acidosis
  Small kidney of unknown cause

Other diseases of urinary system (590–599)
  Infections of kidney
  Chronic pyelonephritis w/o lesion of renal medullary necrosis
  Pyelonephritis, acute, w/o necrosis
  Hydronephrosis
  Calculus of kidney and ureter
  Calculus, kidney
  Calculus, ureter
  Calculus, urinary, unspec.
  Other disorders of kidney and ureter
  Cyst, kidney, acquired
  Proteinuria, benign dfwpostural
  Vesicoureteral reflux, unspec.
  Vesicoureteral reflux w/ nephropathy
  Calculus of lower urinary tract
  Cystitis
  Cystitis, acute
  Cystitis, interstitial, chronic
  Cystitis, irradiation
  Other disorders of bladder
  Bladder neck obstruction
  Atony of bladder
  Other functional disorders of bladder
  Bladder hypertonicity
  Bladder compliance, low
  Neurogenic bladder, NOS
  Detrusor sphincter dyssynergia
  Urethritis, not sexually transmitted, and urethral syndrome
  Urethral syndrome, Non-VD, NOS
  Urethral stricture
  Stricture, urethral, unspec. infection
  Stricture, urethral, traumatic
  Other disorders of urethra and urinary tractk
  Urinary tract infection, unspec./pyuria
  Urinary obstruction, unspec.
  Hematuria

Diseases of male genital organs (600–608)
  Hyperplasia of prostate
  BPH, w/o obstruction
  BPH, w/ obstruction
  Inflammatory diseases of prostate
  Prostatitis, acute
  Prostatitis, chronic
  Prostatitis, NOS
  Other disorders of prostate
  Hydrocele
  Hydrocele, unspec.
  Orchitis and epididymitis
  Orchitis/epididymitis, unspec.
  Redundant prepuce and phimosis
  Phimosis
  Infertility, male
  Infertility, male, unspec.
  Disorders of penis
  Balanitis
  Priapism
  Impotence, organic
  Other disorders of male genital organs
  Seminal vesiculitis
  Spermatocele
  Torsion of testis
  Atrophy of testis
  Hematospermia

Disorders Of Breast (610–612)
  Benign mammary dysplasias
  Other disorders of breast
  Deformity and disproportion of reconstructed breast

Inflammatory Disease Of Female Pelvic Organs (614–616)
  Inflammatory disease of ovary, fallopian tube, pelvic cellular tissue, and peritoneum
  Inflammatory diseases of uterus except cervix
  Inflammatory disease of cervix, vagina, and vulva

Other disorders of female genital tract (617–629)
  Endometriosis of uterus
  Genital prolapse
  Cystocele/rectocele w/o uterine prolapse
  Cystocele, midline
  Urethrocele
  Rectocele
  Prolapse, uterine
  Fistula involving female genital tract
   Urinary-genital tract fistula, female
 Vesicovaginal fistula
  Noninflammatory disorders of ovary, fallopian tube, and broad ligament
  Cyst of ovary, follicular
  Corpus luteum cyst
  Disorders of uterus, not elsewhere classified
  Uterus, hypertrophy
  Endometrial hyperplasia, unspec.
  Noninflammatory disorders of cervix
  Erosion and ectropion of cervix
  Dysplasia, cervix, unspec.
  Stenosis, cervix
  Cervical polyp, NOS
  Noninflammatory disorders of vagina
  Leukorrhea, NOS
  Noninflammatory disorders of vulva and perineum
  Atrophy, vulva
  Pain and other symptoms associated with female genital organs
  Dyspareunia
  Vaginismus
  Mittelschmerz
  Dysmenorrhea
  Premenstrual tension syndrome
  Pelvic congestion syndrome
  Incontinence, stress, female
  Vulvodynia
  Disorders of menstruation and other abnormal bleeding from female
  Absence of menstruation
 Amenorrhea
  Scanty or infrequent menstruation
 Oligomenorrhea
  Excessive or frequent menstruation
  Metrorrhagia
  Menopausal and postmenopausal disorders
  Bleeding, postmenopausal
  Menopausal state, symptomatic
  Vaginitis, postmenopausal atrophic
  Infertility, female
  Other disorders of female genital organs

International Classification of Diseases